Keenan Abrahams (born 27 May 1999) is a South African soccer player who plays as a defender for Steenberg United.

Career statistics

References

1999 births
Living people
South African soccer players
Coloured South African people
Cape Coloureds
Association football defenders
National First Division players
Cape Town Spurs F.C. players
Steenberg United F.C. players
Soccer players from Cape Town
South Africa under-20 international soccer players